Nikolai Vasilyev may refer to:
 Nicolai Vasiliev, a possibly fictitious Russian suggested as a Jack the Ripper suspect
 Nikolay Vasiliev (Russian politician) (born 1958), Russian politician
  (1916–2011), a member of the Soviet Central Committee
 Nicolai A. Vasiliev (1880–1940), Russian logician
Nikolay Ivanovich Vasilyev (colonel) (1906–1941), Soviet army officer
 Nikolai Vasilyevich Vasilyev (1875–1940), Russian architect
 Nikolay Vasilyev (hurdler) (born 1956), Soviet hurdler
 Nikolay Vasilyev (rower) (born 1952), Soviet rower who participated at the 1972 Summer Olympics
 Nikolai Viktorovich Vasilyev (born 1957), Soviet Russian football player and coach